East Okapa Rural LLG is a local-level government (LLG) of Eastern Highlands Province, Papua New Guinea.

Wards
01. Purosa
02. Awarosa
03. Orie
04. Unasa
05. Yagareba
06. Paegatasa
07. Oma-Kasoru
08. Yasubi
09. Yagusa
10. Ibusa
11. Kasoru
12. Ofafina
13. Okapa Station
14. Kawaina
15. Amaira
16. Asempa
17. Sefuna

References

Local-level governments of Eastern Highlands Province